Pinaciophora is an amoeboid genus of Heliozoa of uncertain affinity, previously classified as Rhizaria.

It includes the species Pinaciophora fluviatilis.

It was placed before in Nucleariida.

References

Heliozoa genera